Bolpur Lok Sabha constituency is in West Bengal, in India. While four assembly segments of No. 41 Bolpur Lok Sabha constituency are in Birbhum district, three are in Purba Bardhaman district. The seat was a free seat till 2004, but was declared reserved for scheduled castes from 2009 general elections.

Vidhan Sabha segments

As per order of the Delimitation Commission issued in 2006 in respect of the delimitation of constituencies in the West Bengal, parliamentary constituency no. 41 Bolpur, reserved for Scheduled castes (SC), is composed of the following assembly segments:  

Prior to delimitation, Bolpur Lok Sabha constituency was composed of the following assembly segments:Ausgram (SC) (assembly constituency no. 267), Mangalkot (assembly constituency no. 281), Nanoor (SC) (assembly constituency no. 283), Bolpur (assembly constituency no. 284), Labpur (assembly constituency no. 285), Dubrajpur (assembly constituency no. 286) and Mayureswar (SC) (assembly constituency no. 290)

Members of Lok Sabha

Election results

General election 2019

General election 2014

General elections 2009

General elections 2004

General elections 1999

General elections 1998

General election 1996

General election 1991

General election 1989

1984 Election
 Saradish Roy CPI(M) : 317,749 votes
 Nihar Dutta (Congress) : 256,818

By-election 1985
A by-election was held in this constituency in 1985 which was necessitated by the Sudden Death of sitting CPIM-MP Dr. Saradish Roy. In the by-election, Somnath Chatterjee of CPIM defeated his nearest rival Siddhartha Shankar Ray of Congress by 98,999 votes.

1980 Election
 Saradish Roy CPI(M) : 264,798 votes  
 Pranab mukherjee (Cong-Indira) : 196,169

General elections 1967-2004
Most of the contests were multi-cornered. However, only winners and runners-up are mentioned below:

See also
 List of Constituencies of the Lok Sabha

References

Lok Sabha constituencies in West Bengal
Politics of Birbhum district